Can We Go Wrong is the first solo EP by Hesta Prynn, formerly of the band Northern State. It was officially released on July 6, 2010, but was available weeks earlier through her own website and at her live concerts as the support act for Tegan and Sara. Even before the official release, the album received a positive review from Time Out New York.

In September 2010 Hesta Prynn released a video for the song "Can We Go Wrong". The video is a stop-motion video composed of 13,000 still images. The video was directed by NYC indie director Randy Scott Slavin (videethis.com) and received much attention including a feature on MTV's "The Seven".  Jared Leto of Thirty Seconds to Mars was intrigued by the video and took Hesta Prynn on tour in late 2010.

On December 8, 2010 the song "You Winding Me Up" was releases as a special 7" vinyl single containing two remixed versions of the song. The first is a mash-up with Blondie's Heart of Glass and the second is a remix by Bear Hands.

Track listing

Personnel
Hesta Prynn – vocals, keyboards
 All other instrumentation by Chuck Brody and Jon Siebels

Additional personnel
Eric Gardner – drums
Nate Smith – drums
Randy Schrager – drums
Ainsley Powell – drums
Peter Vartan – guitar
Jack Dolgen – bass

Reception

PopMatters commented on her change in style orientation from hip-hop to dance and an increase in seriousness saying: "Compared to the verbose rhymes of her jokey Northern State work, Prynn is downright laconic here. She’s crafty with hooks, too, and the half-wordless chorus of “Whoa Whoa” owes its amorphousness not to nonchalance, but necessity; after a certain point in the night, words are irrelevant."

References

2010 EPs